Tetragonoderus matilei is a species of beetle in the family Carabidae. It was described by Ball in 2000.

References

matilei
Beetles described in 2000